The Faulkes Telescope North is a clone of the Liverpool Telescope, and is located at Haleakala Observatory in the U.S. state of Hawaii. It is a  f/10 Ritchey-Chrétien telescope.

The telescope is owned and operated by LCOGT. This telescope and its sister telescope Faulkes Telescope South are used by research and education groups around the globe. The Faulkes Telescope Project is one such group which provides observing time (awarded by LCOGT) for educational projects for UK schools and amateur astronomers.

In 2013, it imaged the defunct Herschel Space Observatory.

See also
List of largest optical reflecting telescopes
Faulkes Telescope South
Liverpool Telescope

References

External links 
 Faulkes Telescope Project website
 LCOGT - The organisation which owns and operates the Faulkes Telescopes

Optical telescopes
Robotic telescopes
Astronomy in the United Kingdom
Astronomical observatories in Hawaii
Minor-planet discovering observatories